Gloucester Road is a London Underground station in Kensington, west London.  The station entrance is located close to the junction of Gloucester Road and Cromwell Road. Close by are the Cromwell Hospital and Baden-Powell House.

The station is served by the District, Circle and Piccadilly lines. On the District and Piccadilly lines, the station is between South Kensington and Earl's Court, and on the Circle line, it is between South Kensington and High Street Kensington. It is in London fare zone 1.

The station is in two parts: sub-surface platforms, opened in 1868 by the Metropolitan Railway as part of the company's extension of the Inner Circle route from Paddington to South Kensington and to Westminster; and deep-level platforms opened in 1906 by the Great Northern, Piccadilly and Brompton Railway. A variety of underground and main line services have operated over the sub-surface tracks. The deep-level platforms have remained largely unaltered with no lift access. A disused sub-surface platform features periodic art installations as part of Transport for London's Art on the Underground scheme.

History

Sub-surface station

The station was opened as Brompton (Gloucester Road) on 1 October 1868 by the Metropolitan Railway (MR, later the Metropolitan line) when it opened an extension from Paddington (Praed Street) (now Paddington). The station acted as the temporary terminus of the railway until 24 December 1868 when the MR opened tracks to South Kensington to connect to the first section of the District Railway (DR, later the District line) which opened on the same day from South Kensington to Westminster. The station was provided with four platforms sheltered by an elliptical glazed iron roof. A two-storey station building in cream-coloured brick with arched windows and an ornamental balustrade at roof level was built at the eastern end. Initially, the MR operated all services over both companies' tracks.

Residential development had been gradually spreading westward from Belgravia since the 1840s, but the area around the station site was mainly in horticultural use as market gardens when the new line was constructed. The planning of the line encouraged the local land owners, including Lord Kensington, to extend Cromwell Road westwards and the opening of Gloucester Road station, stimulated rapid residential development in the surrounding area.

On 12 April 1869, the DR opened a south-westward extension from Gloucester Road to West Brompton where it opened an interchange station with the West London Extension Joint Railway (WLEJR, now the West London line). At the opening there was no intermediate station – Earl's Court station did not open until 1871 – and the service operated as a shuttle between the two stations. On 1 August 1870, the DR opened additional tracks between Gloucester Road and South Kensington and the West Brompton shuttle became a through service.

On 3 July 1871, the DR opened its own tracks between Gloucester Road and High Street Kensington. These tracks, the Cromwell Curve, were opened without Parliamentary authority in an unsuccessful attempt by the DR to improve its share of the revenues between High Street Kensington and South Kensington stations which were divided on the basis of mileage of track owned by the two companies.

On 1 February 1872, the DR opened a northbound branch from its station at Earl's Court to connect to the West London Extension Joint Railway (WLEJR, now the West London line) at Addison Road (now Kensington (Olympia)). From that date the Outer Circle service began running over the DR's tracks. The service was run by the North London Railway (NLR) from its terminus at Broad Street (now demolished) in the City of London via the North London line to Willesden Junction, then the West London Line to Addison Road and the DR to Mansion House – at that time the eastern terminus of the DR.

From 1 August 1872, the Middle Circle service also began operations through Gloucester Road, running from Moorgate along the MR's tracks on the north side of the Inner Circle to Paddington, then over the Hammersmith & City Railway (H&CR) track to Latimer Road, then, via a now demolished link, on the WLEJR to Addison Road and the DR to Mansion House. The service was operated jointly by the H&CR and the DR.

On 30 June 1900, the Middle Circle service was withdrawn between Earl's Court and Mansion House, and, on 31 December 1908, the Outer Circle service was also shortened to terminate at Earl's Court. In 1949, the Metropolitan line-operated Inner Circle route was given its own identity on the tube map as the Circle line. In 1907, "Brompton" was dropped from the station's name to bring it into accordance with the deep-level station.

In the 1970s, the eastbound Circle line platform was taken out of use and the track layout was rearranged to remove the westbound Circle line track and widen the island platform. The eastbound Circle and District lines both serve the north side of the island platform and the westbound Circle line which was redirected to serve the south side of the island platform. The disused platform is used for Art on the Underground installations, often placed into the brick recesses in the northern retaining wall. In the 1990s a deck was constructed above the District and Circle line platforms on which was constructed a shopping mall and apartment building.

Deep-level station

By the beginning of the 20th century, the DR had been extended to Richmond, Ealing Broadway, Hounslow West and Wimbledon in the west and to New Cross Gate in the east. The southern section of the Inner Circle was suffering considerable congestion between South Kensington and Mansion House, between which stations the DR was running an average of 20 trains per hour with more in the peak periods.

To relieve the congestion, the DR planned an express deep-level tube line starting from a connection to its sub-surface tracks west of Gloucester Road and running to Mansion House. The tunnels were planned to run about  beneath the existing sub-surface route with only one intermediate stop at Charing Cross (now Embankment). Parliamentary approval was obtained in 1897 but no work was done. In 1898, the DR took over the Great Northern, Piccadilly and Brompton Railway#Brompton and Piccadilly Circus Railway, 1896 (B&PCR) which had a route planned from South Kensington to Piccadilly Circus. The route was modified to join the DR deep-level route at South Kensington.

Following the purchase of the DR by the Underground Electric Railways Company of London in 1902, the planned DR and B&PCR lines were merged with a third proposed route from the Great Northern, Piccadilly and Brompton Railway#Great Northern and Strand Railway, 1898. The DR deep-level route was revised at its western end to continue to Earl's Court and surface to the east of Barons Court. The deep-level platforms were opened on 15 December 1906 by the Great Northern, Piccadilly and Brompton Railway (GNP&BR, now the Piccadilly line) which ran between Finsbury Park and Hammersmith. A new surface building for the lifts was designed by Leslie Green with the GNP&BR's distinctive ox-blood red glazed terracotta façade.

As part of the development over the sub-surface platforms, the station buildings were remodelled internally to share a single entrance and ticket office. Space in the Piccadilly line building that was formerly used for operational purposes or as the exit to the street is now used for retail purposes. During the 2000s, the deep-level parts of the station underwent refurbishment with areas of damaged wall tiles being replaced. The dark green and cream tiled walls of the Piccadilly line's lower level passages and platforms were restored, with damaged tiles being replaced by reproductions to match the original designs.

On 24 May 1957 Teresa Lubienska, a Polish Countess who had survived Auschwitz concentration camp, was stabbed five times on the eastbound Piccadilly line platform and died shortly afterwards. Her murder remains unsolved to this day.

Artwork on disused platform 

In 2000, the disused eastbound platform was suggested as a location for temporary art installations, with artworks located in the brick recesses in the northern retaining wall. Platform for Art, and subsequently Art on the Underground have used the disused platform for temporary installations of sculptures, murals or photographs. Artworks have been by a variety of artists over the past 20 years, including David Shrigley, Chiho Aoshima and Heather Phillipson.

Services
The station is in London fare zone 1. On the District and Piccadilly lines, the station is between Earl's Court and South Kensington, and on the Circle line, it is between High Street Kensington and South Kensington. Gloucester Road is the westernmost interchange between these three lines, although the tube map promotes the easier interchange at South Kensington. Train frequencies vary throughout the day, but generally District line trains operate every 2–6 minutes from approximately 05:15 to 00:28 eastbound and 05:59 to 00:47 westbound; they are supplemented by Circle line trains every 8–12 minutes. Piccadilly line trains operate every 2–6 minutes from approximately 05:41 to 00:25 eastbound and 05:56 to 00:43 westbound. The Piccadilly line operates a 24-hour Night Tube service on Fridays and Saturdays.

On the Piccadilly line 1973 Stock is used. On the Circle and District lines S Stock is used.

Connections
London Buses routes 49 and 74 and night routes N74 and N97 serve the station.

Notes and references

Notes

References

Bibliography

External links

 London Transport Museum Photographic Archive
 
 
 
 
 
 
 
 

Circle line (London Underground) stations
District line stations
Piccadilly line stations
London Underground Night Tube stations
Tube stations in the Royal Borough of Kensington and Chelsea
Former Great Northern, Piccadilly and Brompton Railway stations
Former Metropolitan Railway stations
Railway stations in Great Britain opened in 1868
Former Metropolitan District Railway stations
Railway stations in Great Britain opened in 1869
1868 establishments in England
Leslie Green railway stations
Brompton, London